Paratheocris lunulata is a species of beetle in the family Cerambycidae. It was described by Hintz in 1919, originally under the genus Latisternum. It is known from the Democratic Republic of the Congo.

References

Theocridini
Beetles described in 1919
Endemic fauna of the Democratic Republic of the Congo